Antti Markus Sumiala (born 20 February 1974) is a Finnish former footballer. He played his last years in his hometown team FC PoPa. He was born in Pori, and played as a striker. He also worked as his teams sports director and is a main owner of FC PoPa.

International career
Sumiala appeared 36 times for the Finnish national team, scoring nine goals. He made his debut on 12 February 1992 in a friendly against Turkey (1-1).

References

Profile

1974 births
Living people
Sportspeople from Pori
Finnish footballers
Finland international footballers
Ikast FS players
Association football forwards
FC Twente players
FC Emmen players
NEC Nijmegen players
FC Jokerit players
SSV Reutlingen 05 players
Sporting Kansas City players
IFK Norrköping players
Akçaabat Sebatspor footballers
FC Vaduz players
FC Jazz players
Veikkausliiga players
Eredivisie players
Eerste Divisie players
Süper Lig players
Danish Superliga players
Allsvenskan players
Swiss Challenge League players
Major League Soccer players
Finnish expatriate footballers
Finnish expatriate sportspeople in Denmark
Expatriate men's footballers in Denmark
Finnish expatriate sportspeople in the Netherlands
Expatriate footballers in the Netherlands
Finnish expatriate sportspeople in Germany
Expatriate footballers in Germany
Finnish expatriate sportspeople in Turkey
Expatriate footballers in Turkey
Finnish expatriate sportspeople in Sweden
Expatriate footballers in Sweden
Finnish expatriate sportspeople in Liechtenstein
Expatriate footballers in Liechtenstein
Finnish expatriate sportspeople in the United States
Expatriate soccer players in the United States
Musan Salama players